Statistica is a quarterly peer-reviewed open access scientific journal dealing with methodological and technical aspects of statistics and statistical analyses in the various scientific fields.

It was established in 1931 as the Supplemento statistico ai nuovi problemi di Politica, Storia ed Economia (English: Statistical Supplement to the New Problems of Politics, History and Economics) and obtained its current title in 1941. It is published by the University of Bologna and is an historical Italian journal in the field of statistics. The founding editor-in-chief was Paolo Fortunati and Italo Scardovi was editor from 1981 till 2004. The current editor-in-chief is Simone Giannerini (University of Bologna).

Famous scholars collaborated to Statistica as members of Scientific Board or simply as authors of papers. Among them there are Corrado Gini, Bruno De Finetti, Carlo E. Bonferroni, Marcel Fréchet, Samuel Kotz, Camilo Dagum, Estelle Bee Dagum, Italo Scardovi.

Abstracting and indexing 
The journal is abstracted and indexed in Web of Science Core Collection – Emerging Sources Citation Index, a Clarivate Analytics database and Repec.

References

External links 
 

Statistics journals
Creative Commons Attribution-licensed journals
Publications established in 1931
Quarterly journals
University of Bologna
English-language journals
Academic journals published by universities and colleges